The Blechhammer area was the location of Nazi Germany chemical plants, prisoner of war camps and forced labour camps.

Blechhammer may also refer to:

Blechhammer, Eibenstock, Saxony, Germany 
Blechhammer concentration camp, part of the Blechhammer area in Nazi Germany

See also